W.L.A.K. is the debut studio album from the Christian hip hop-contemporary R&B music group W.L.A.K. (We Live As Kings). It was released on their own independent label Collision Records on March 5, 2013. The album charted on the Billboard 200 at No. 81, and it was awarded a five star rating by New Release Tuesday and a four star rating from Rapzilla.

Critical reception

W.L.A.K. garnered critical praise from all five music critics ratings and reviews. At New Release Tuesday, Dwayne Lacy rated the album a perfect five stars, stating how the release had "nice productions" making "The placements of the songs, verses, etc are well put together." Steve Hayes of Cross Rhythms rated the album eight out of ten squares, writing that "The project finely balances soaring quality in production and hooks, yet with a slightly underground vibe at times". At Rapzilla, Timothy Welbeck rated the album four stars out of five, saying that "WLAK is not only a counter cultural rallying cry for disciples of Christ, it is also a grand introduction of Collision Records’ as one of, if not the premier roster, in all of Christian Hip Hop and potentially hip-hop at large." At Christian Music Zine, Anthony Peronto rated the album a perfect five stars, remarking that on an "undeniably excellent" that "The theme is clearly and wonderfully communicated, each artist shines through but came together cohesively, and the record is a fine representation of the record label they come from." The Christian Manifesto rated the album four-and-a-half stars out of five, observing that "While not perfect" the album "is street-smart, savvy, and musically imaginative, the emcees play well off of one another’s strengths, it features a profound theme throughout, boasts solid production and maneuvering, and fills in the gaps where one artist might be lacking."

Commercial performance
For the Billboard charting week of March 23, 2013, W.L.A.K. was the No. 81 most sold album in the entirety of the United States via the Billboard 200, which it was the No. 6 most sold on the Christian Albums chart, and the No. 1 most sold on the Gospel Albums. In addition, it was the No. 7 most sold on the Rap Albums chart, and it was the No. 15 most sold of the Independent Albums.

Track listing

Chart performance

References

2013 debut albums
Hip hop albums by American artists